The 2008 Puerto Rico Soccer League Playoffs is the first year the tournament has been held. It is the championship of the Puerto Rico Soccer League. The format is set up for the  top 4 teams from the league playing in the Tournament. These teams play in the Semi-finals with the winner of each match going on to the Championship game.

2008 Puerto Rico Soccer League playoffs

Champions
Sevilla FC won the Championship as they defeated River Plate Ponce 2-1 in the final.

Segunda División Season Standings

PlayOffs

References

Puerto Rico Soccer League seasons
1
Puerto Rican
Puerto Rican